Histurodes costaricana is a species of moth of the family Tortricidae. It is found in Costa Rica.

Larvae have been reared on Persea americana.

References

Moths described in 1984
Polyorthini